CYFI may refer to:
Cyrillic Font Initiative, part of the Medieval Unicode Font Initiative
Child and Youth Finance International, a global non-profit organization based in the Netherland
Fort MacKay/Firebag Aerodrome (ICAO code CYFI), an airport in Alberta, Canada.